Nurlat (Norlat) is a town in the Republic of Tatarstan, Russia, located on the Kondurcha River,  southeast of Kazan. Population:

History
Nurlat was formerly known as Nurlat-Oktyabrsky.

It was founded in 1905 as a settlement around a railway station. Town status was granted to it in 1961.

Administrative and municipal status
Within the framework of administrative divisions, Nurlat serves as the administrative center of Nurlatsky District, even though it is not a part of it. As an administrative division, is incorporated separately as the town of republic significance of Nurlat—an administrative unit with the status equal to that of the districts. As a municipal division, the town of republic significance of Nurlat is incorporated within Nurlatsky Municipal District as Nurlat Urban Settlement.

Transportation
There is an airport in Nurlat.

See also
Nurlatsky District
Kichkalnya

References

Notes

Sources

External links
Unofficial website of Nurlat 

Cities and towns in Tatarstan
Nurlatsky District
Samarsky Uyezd